Putative RNA-binding protein 3 is a protein that in humans is encoded by the RBM3 gene.

Function 

This gene is a member of the glycine-rich RNA-binding protein family and encodes a protein with one RNA recognition motif (RRM) domain. Expression of this gene is induced by cold shock and low oxygen tension. A pseudogene exists on chromosome 1. Alternate transcriptional splice variants, encoding different isoforms, have been characterized.

RBM3 is cold-induced RNA binding protein and is involved in mRNA biogenesis exerts anti-apoptotic effects. According to antibody-based profiling and transcriptomics analysis, RBM3 protein is present in all analysed human tissues and based on confocal microscopy mainly localised to the nucleoplasm.

Clinical significance 

RBM3 is a proto-oncogene that is associated with tumor progression and metastasis and is a potential cancer biomarker. Based on patient survival data, high levels of RBM3 protein in tumor cells is a favourable prognostic biomarker in colorectal cancer.

References

Further reading